The 1959 NC State Wolfpack football team represented North Carolina State University during the 1959 NCAA University Division football season. The Wolfpack were led by sixth-year head coach Earle Edwards and played their home games at Riddick Stadium in Raleigh, North Carolina. They competed as members of the Atlantic Coast Conference, finishing in last with an 0–6 conference record.

Schedule

References

NC State
NC State Wolfpack football seasons
NC State Wolfpack football